Tazeh Kand-e Divan Ali (also Romanized as Tāzeh Kand-e Dīvān ʿAlī; also known as Dīvānlaq and Tāzeh Kand-e Dīvānlīq) is a village in Garmeh-ye Jonubi Rural District, in the Central District of Meyaneh County, East Azerbaijan Province, Iran. At the 2006 census, its population was 58, in 13 families.

References 

Populated places in Meyaneh County